Raymond G. Sanchez (born September 22, 1941) is an American attorney, lobbyist, and former politician who served as a member of the New Mexico House of Representatives.

Early life and education

Raymond G. Sanchez was born in Albuquerque, New Mexico, on September 22, 1941.
He attended the University of New Mexico, where he earned a Bachelor of Arts in Government in 1964 and Juris Doctor from the University of New Mexico School of Law in 1967. His younger brother is Michael S. Sanchez, an attorney who served in the New Mexico Senate.

Career

Sanchez was elected to the New Mexico House of Representatives for district 15 in 1971. He held office until 2000.
Sanchez and Walter K. Martinez were leaders of the liberal "Mama Lucy Gang". This group controlled the house and prevented conservative "Cowboy Democrats" from the ranching areas in the south of the state from controlling the main committees. In the 1982 election, the liberal Democrats formed a solid majority of the forty seven Democrat members, and Sanchez was elected speaker without opposition from the Cowboys.
Sanchez was speaker of the house for sixteen years. In 2000, Raymond Sanchez failed to be reelected to the house, losing to newcomer John Sanchez, a Republican.

After leaving office, Sanchez returned to practicing the law, mainly working on government relations and personal injury. Sanchez became a president of the regents of the University of New Mexico.

In the 2010s, Sanchez was working as a lobbyist at the New Mexico legislature for clients such as Virgin Galactic. Sanchez also worked as a lobbyist for Albuquerque cab companies.

References
Notes

Citations

Sources

 
 
 
 
 
 
 
 
 

1941 births
Living people
Hispanic and Latino American state legislators in New Mexico
Speakers of the New Mexico House of Representatives
Democratic Party members of the New Mexico House of Representatives